Brasilestes is an extinct genus of mammals from the Late Cretaceous (Campanian-Maastrichtian) of South America. Its type species, B. stardusti, is named after David Bowie.

Description
Brasilestes is noted to be relatively large for a Mesozoic mammal, with a length speculated at around 50 cm.

Classification
Brasilestes is a tribosphenic mammal. It is tentatively assigned to Eutheria due to contemporary eutherian remains in the Adamantina Formation.

Palaeoecology
Brasilestes occurs in the Adamantina Formation, alongside a plethora of dinosaur and notosuchian taxa. Contemporary mammals include eutherians, gondwanatheres and meridiolestidans.

References 

Tribosphenida
Prehistoric mammal genera
Maastrichtian life
Late Cretaceous tetrapods of South America
Cretaceous mammals of South America
Fossils of Brazil
Adamantina Formation
Fossil taxa described in 2018